The 1984 Louisville Cardinals football team represented the University of Louisville in the 1984 NCAA Division I-A football season. The Cardinals, led by fifth-year head coach Bob Weber, participated as independents and played their home games at Cardinal Stadium.

Schedule

References

Louisville
Louisville Cardinals football seasons
Louisville Cardinals football